Manami Kamitanida is a Japanese long-distance runner who competes in marathon races.

At the 2014 Tokyo Marathon she finished in 9th place.

At the 2015 Gold Coast Marathon she finished in 3rd place behind Risa Takenaka and Keiko Nogami.

References

External links

ARRS profile

Living people
Japanese female long-distance runners
Japanese female marathon runners
Year of birth missing (living people)
21st-century Japanese women